In Search of Darkness is a 2019 documentary film written and directed by David A. Weiner and executive produced by Robin Block of CreatorVC Studios. An international co-production of the United Kingdom and the United States, the film explores the development and lasting impact of the horror film genre during the 1980s, and features interviews with numerous horror icons both from that decade and from the modern era, along with popular horror influencers.

In Search of Darkness premiered at the 2019 Beyond Fest.

Cast

 Tom Atkins
 Doug Bradley
 Joe Bob Briggs
 Lori Cardille
 John Carpenter
 Nick Castle
 Larry Cohen
 Jeffrey Combs
 Barbara Crampton
 Sean S. Cunningham
 Joe Dante
 Keith David
 Katie Featherston
 Mick Garris
 Michael Gingold
 Stuart Gordon
 Andre Gower
 Gunship
 Spencer Hickman
 Kane Hodder
 Tom Holland
 Graham Humphreys
 Lloyd Kaufman
 Robert Kurtzman
 Heather Langenkamp
 Don Mancini
 Harry Manfredini
 Kelli Maroney
 Robbi Morgan
 Bill Moseley
 Greg Nicotero
 Phil Nobile Jr.
Cassandra Peterson
 James Rolfe
 Ken Sagoes
 Ben Scrivens
 James A. Janisse (Dead Meat)
 Corey Taylor
 Cecil Trachenburg
 Ryan Turek
 Caroline Williams
 Alex Winter
 Heather Wixson
 Tom Woodruff Jr.
 Brian Yuzna

Production
In Search of Darkness initially began as a crowdfunding campaign on Kickstarter in October 2018, and the project met its initial goal in two days. It went on to amass £99,478 in pledges from 1,532 backers on Kickstarter, before later moving platforms to Indiegogo in March 2019, where it has raised over £234,300. The film received an exclusive release in 2019 to backers of the project.

Critical reception
Josh Weiss of Forbes called the documentary "a scary good magnum opus" and recommended it for fans of horror fiction and for those interested in history, writing: "At times, you'll be lost in wonder at how this comprehensively epic behemoth was cut together in the first place. [...] This is a definitive, intimate, anecdotal, thematic, funny, and loving oral history of a decade that changed the face of big screen horror forever." Michelle Swope of Dread Central gave the film a score of 5 out of 5, writing that "even at about four hours long, it's never boring", and summarizing it as "an all-encompassing, delightfully spooky love letter to eighties horror."

Carolyn Mauricette of Rue Morgue wrote that "You might find the volume of information overwhelming at first because they come at you with a rapid-fire pace, but once you settle in, this documentary is a great ride." Noah Berlatsky of The Verge called the documentary "a compulsively watchable delight" and wrote that "even hardcore genre fans are bound to find something new they'd like to see or something old they want to revisit". Jessica Gomez of All Horror wrote: "It's well-researched, well-rounded, and filmed without bias. A masterpiece worthy of the most important decade of horror."

Series
In Search of Darkness was the second installment of the In Search of documentary series, following In Search of the Last Action Heroes, which is dedicated to 1980s and 1990s action cinema.
It was followed by several further films: In Search of Tomorrow, which chronicles science fiction films of the 1980s, and In Search of Darkness: Part II and Part III, which serve as a direct continuation of In Search of Darkness.

References

External links
 
 

2019 documentary films
British documentary films
Documentary films about films
Documentary films about horror
2010s English-language films
Films directed by David A. Weiner
2010s British films